William Templeman may refer to:
 William Templeman (politician), Canadian newspaper editor and politician
 William Templeman (chemist), English chemist and munitions expert, army officer and solicitor
 Willie Templeman, Scottish footballer